Schizoglossa, common name the Paua slugs, is a genus of medium-sized to large predatory, air-breathing, land slugs, carnivorous terrestrial pulmonate gastropod molluscs in the family Rhytididae. They are currently classified by the New Zealand Department of Conservation as Nationally Vulnerable.

Distribution
The genus is endemic to the North Island of New Zealand (including the Great Barrier Island),

Species and subspecies
Species and subspecies within the genus Schizoglossa include:
 Schizoglossa gigantea Powell, 1930
 Schizoglossa major Powell, 1938 - subfossil only
Schizoglossa novoseelandica (Pfeiffer, 1862)
 Schizoglossa novoseelandica novoseelandica (Pfeiffer, 1862)
 Schizoglossa novoseelandica barrierensis Powell, 1949
 Schizoglossa worthyae Powell, 1949

Description 
The shell is small, rudimentary, auriform (ear-shaped) and is situated far back on the animal. The shell is incapable of containing the body, and is reduced to the function of a shield for the lungs and heart. The shell is paucispiral, and is nacreous within. The columella is excavated into a pit for the reception of the shell-muscle.

The animal has no rachidian teeth.

Ecology 
Schizoglossa has eggs with a calcareous surface which lacks cuticle.

References

This article incorporates public domain text from reference.

Further reading 
 Powell A. W. B. (1949) "The Paryphantidae of New Zealand. No. VI. Distribution, hybrids and new species of Paryphanta, Rhytida and Schizoglossa". ''Records of the Auckland Institute and Museum 3: 347-367.

Rhytididae